Kevin Nickelberry (born October 15, 1964) is an American college basketball coach and current assistant coach at Georgetown.

Nickelberry is the former head men's basketball coach at Howard University, as well as at Hampton University.

Head coaching record

Men's

Women's

Personal life
Born in Washington, D.C., he is a member of Alpha Phi Alpha fraternity.

References

External links
 

1964 births
Living people
American expatriate basketball people in Libya
American men's basketball coaches
American men's basketball players
Basketball coaches from Washington, D.C.
Basketball players from Washington, D.C.
Charlotte 49ers men's basketball coaches
Clemson Tigers men's basketball coaches
College men's basketball head coaches in the United States
DePaul Blue Demons men's basketball coaches
Hampton Pirates men's basketball coaches
Holy Cross Crusaders men's basketball coaches
Howard Bison men's basketball coaches
LSU Tigers basketball coaches
Monmouth Hawks men's basketball coaches
Virginia Wesleyan Marlins men's basketball players